Advanced Modular Armor Protection (AMAP) is modular composite armour concept, developed by the German company IBD Deisenroth Engineering. According to IBD AMAP is a 4th generation composite armour, making use of nano-ceramics and modern steel alloy technologies.
AMAP is the successor of MEXAS.

Some modules of the AMAP family can be combined to create an all-around protection.

Structure
AMAP is making use of new advanced steel alloys, Aluminium-Titanium alloys, nanometric steels, ceramics and nano-ceramics. The new high-hardened steel needs 30% less thickness to offer the same protection level as ARMOX500Z High Hard Armour steel.
While Titanium requires only 58% as much weight as rolled homogeneous armour (RHA) for reaching the same level of protection, Mat 7720 new, a newly developed Aluminium-Titanium alloy, needs only 38% of the weight. That means that this alloy is more than twice as protective as RHA of the same weight.

AMAP is also making use of new nano-ceramics, which are harder and lighter than current ceramics, while having multi-hit capability. Normal ceramic tiles and a liner backing have a mass-efficiency (EM) value of 3 compared to normal steel armour, while it fulfills STANAG 4569. The new nano-crystalline ceramic materials should increase the hardness compared to current ceramics by 70% and the weight reduction is 30%, therefore the EM value is larger than 4. Furthermore, the higher fracture toughness increases the general multi-hit capability. Some AMAP-modules might consist of this new ceramic tiles glued on a backing liner and overlaid by a cover, a concept which is also used by MEXAS. Lightweight slat armor is also part of the AMAP family.
In excess new nano-ceramic armour overlaying a vehicle's base armour, which is backed up by a spall-liner, can achieve a weight reduction of more than 40% to meet the Level 3 of STANAG 4569. Furthermore, AMAP's glue and lining components work efficiently even at high temperatures (like ).

AMAP is a modular protection concept, therefore several modules, some of them in different variants according to the required protection level, are formed. The efficiency may be increased if more types of AMAP-modules are used.

AMAP modules

AMAP-ADS 

An active protection system named AMAP-ADS (Active Defense System) was developed to prevent a vehicle from being hit by ballistic threats. The system is also known under the name AAC in Sweden and under the name Shark in France.
AMAP-ADS is by now one of the fastest active protection systems. In contrast to millisecond systems like Raytheon's Quick Kill or IMI's Iron Fist it is a microsecond system, needing only microseconds to react. This reduces the minimum defeat distance and enables protection against more different threats like RPGs or EFPs.

Sensors for target detection and countermeasures are installed all around the vehicle. The system weight is 140 kg for light vehicles and up to 500 kg for heavy vehicles.

AMAP-AIR 
AMAP-AIR is designed to protect aircraft like the Eurocopter Tiger. Aircraft require special lightweight armour.

AMAP-B 
AMAP-B (ballistic) provides protection against kinetic energy penetrators such as bullets, autocannon calibers such as 20 mm to 30 mm, and against APFSDS of tank guns like modern 120 mm or 125 mm rounds. Like MEXAS AMAP-B exists in three versions. Light offers protection against small arms for light armoured or soft-skinned vehicles, helicopters, aircraft and boats. The medium version of AMAP-B is normally used on medium armoured vehicles such as the IFVs and APCs. These vehicles normally need protection against autocannons up to 30 mm caliber. The heavy AMAP-B version is for use on tanks.

AMAP-IED 
AMAP-IED is designed for protection against mines. Mines have caused high losses to troops in Afghanistan and Iraq. AMAP-IED is used in two protection levels, level 1 provides protection against small arms fire, fragments and blasts, upgraded to level two it is also protecting against EFPs and rocket-propelled grenades like the RPG-7. The level 2 also includes a mine protection.

AMAP-L

AMAP-L (liner) is the spall liner of AMAP. AMAP-L can be attached to soft-skinned or armoured vehicles. The spall cone which is normally 87° can be reduced to only 17°. Over 30,000 vehicles have been fitted with spall lining systems of IBD.

AMAP-M 
AMAP-M (mine) is a mine protection armour module. It fulfills STANAG 4569 and has a lower weight than conventional mine protection systems.

AMAP-MPS
AMAP-MPS (multi purpose seat) is a special blast-protected seat. Contrary to normal seats, it is not attached to the vehicle floor or roof, so shock-energy can be absorbed by the seats.

AMAP-P 
AMAP-P uses retractable modules, similar to side skirts or slat armour, to effectively defeat RPGs. It is a modern variant of spaced armour. AMAP-P is multi-hit-capable. Its areal density is lower than 15 kg/m2.

AMAP-R 
AMAP-R (roof) is designed to protect the roof of a vehicle against artillery bomblets and EFPs. AMAP-R consists of two armour layers, called AMAP-R Level 1 and AMAP-R Level 2. Compared to conventional roof protection, which can have an aerial density of up to 450 kg/m2, AMAP-R is very lightweight (Level 1 has an aerial density of only 25 kg/m2, Level 1 and 2 together have an aerial density of 120 kg/m2). The normal vehicle armour is overlaid by one or two layer of AMAP-R. Level 1 provides protection against bomblets, while Level 2 protects against EFPs.

AMAP-S
AMAP-S (stealth) is IBD's solution of reducing vehicle signature. AMAP-S can be fitted to naval vehicles, like ships, land vehicles and aircraft. The facility of IBD has own instruments to measure the signatures of a vehicle.

AMAP-SC 
AMAP-SC (shaped charge) has a very high mass-efficiency, the EM is between 8 and 10. AMAP-SC has multi-hit capability and protects also against other threats including mines. Since AMAP-SC is passive armour, in contrast to ERA, no explosives are used, so collateral damage is reduced to a minimum.

AMAP-T 
AMAP-T (transparency) is the bulletproof glass component of AMAP. The use of modern ceramic armour reduces the weight by up to 50% compared to normal bulletproof glass of the same protection level. It meets STANAG 4569 levels 1 to 4.

Applications

Some of the known applications for AMAP include following armoured vehicles:

Light and medium vehicles
  – Combat Vehicle 90: AMAP-M, only some variants. Norwegian CV90s have been upgraded with a new protection suite developed by IBD and Rheinmetall Chempro.
  – VTLM: AMAP-B, AMAP-L, AMAP-M, AMAP-IED and AMAP-T
  – Patria AMV: AMAP-B
  – Puma: AMAP-B and AMAP-SC
  – MRAV Boxer: AMAP-B, AMAP-L, AMAP-M and AMAP-IED 
  – VBC
  – VAB IBD has received an order to equip this vehicle type with a new mine-protection

Heavy vehicles

 Leopard 2 tanks
Leopard 2A4 Evolution: The up-armoured Leopard 2SGs of the Singapore Army are equipped with it.
 Leopard 2 Revolution: A Leopard 2 upgrade developed by Rheinmetall based on IBD's evolution concept. 61 from 103 Leopard 2A4+ of the Indonesian Army are upgraded to Revolution standard, known as "Leopard 2RI".
 Strv 122B+ Evolution: An upgrade developed to increase the all-round survivability of Swedish Strv 122 tanks. Newly developed SLAT armour is used to protect the rear.

Aircraft
  – Eurocopter Tiger: AMAP-AIR only

The active protection system AMAP-ADS have already been tested on several vehicles including the SPz Marder, SEP, CV90120, AMV 8x8 and LMV.

External links
Webpage of the manufacturer
Active Defence System (ADS)
The Art of Armor Development

References

Vehicle armour
Armoured fighting vehicle equipment
Land active protection systems
Weapons countermeasures